Professional Murder Music is the first studio album by American metal band Professional Murder Music, released on May 22, 2001 through Geffen Records. Reviewers particularly favored their cover of "A Night Like This".

Track listing
"Slow" – 3:58
"Fall Again" – 3:55
"Of Unknown Origin" – 3:59
"Does It Dream" – 4:14
"Darker" – 4:01
"These Days" – 4:30
"Sleep Deprivation" – 4:25
"A Night Like This" (The Cure cover) – 3:28
"Everything in the World" – 3:20
"Dissolve" – 4:14
"Your World" – 3:35
"Painkiller Introduction" – 3:51

References

2001 albums
Professional Murder Music albums